Anja Reinalter (born 1 May 1970) is a German politician. Reinalter became a member of the Bundestag in the 2021 German federal election. She is affiliated with the Alliance 90/The Greens party.

References

External links 
 

Living people
1970 births
People from Laupheim
21st-century German politicians
21st-century German women politicians
Members of the Bundestag for Alliance 90/The Greens
Members of the Bundestag 2021–2025
Female members of the Bundestag
20th-century German women